White Gardenia is an album by jazz saxophonist Johnny Griffin with brass and strings which was recorded in 1961 and released on the Riverside label. Intended as a tribute album to jazz singer Billie Holiday, who had died two years earlier, she had sung all of the songs, except for the title track, which is the only original composition by Griffin on the album. The white gardenia was the flower Holiday often wore in her hair. The orchestral arrangements were written by Melba Liston and Norman Simmons.

Reception

Richard Cook and Brian Morton wrote in their Penguin Guide to Jazz on CD: "A delightful, smoothly orchestrated tribute to Lady Day that manages to be more than just pastiche" with the strings serving "mainly for depth of focus and harmony, rather than as emotional treacle."
The AllMusic site review by Scott Yanow stated the arrangements were "tasteful, and the lyrical music is well-performed, if not overly memorable. Worth checking out".

Release notes
A review of White Gardenia in DownBeat from March 1962 indicates that the album was in fact released not until about that time. Riverside also released the title track as a single with "Good Morning, Heartache" as B-side (R 4514), and a 7" EP with four tracks, adding "Detour Ahead" and "No More" (SE-2056). In 1973, the album was reissued on a double LP coupled with another recording by Griffin with Orchestra from May and June 1960, originally released as The Big Soul-Band (Big Soul on Milestone). White Gardenia was later reissued on CD as part of the Original Jazz Classics series on OJCCD 1877-2.

Track listing
 "Gloomy Sunday" (Sam M. Lewis, Rezső Seress) – 4:06
 "That Old Devil Called Love" (Doris Fisher, Allan Roberts) – 3:50
 "White Gardenia" (Johnny Griffin) – 3:18
 "God Bless the Child" (Billie Holiday, Arthur Herzog, Jr.) – 3:17
 "Detour Ahead" (Lou Carter, Herb Ellis, Johnny Frigo) – 4:33
 "Good Morning Heartache" (Ervin Drake, Dan Fisher, Irene Higginbotham) – 4:10
 "Don't Explain" (Holiday, Herzog) – 4:43
 "Trav'lin' Light" (Trummy Young, Jimmy Mundy, Johnny Mercer) – 4:06
 "No More" (Tutti Camarata, Bob Russell) – 3:57
 "Left Alone" (Holiday, Mal Waldron) – 2:54
Tracks 1, 7 and 9 were recorded on July 13, tracks 2, 5 and 8 were recorded July 14, and tracks 3, 4, 6 and 10 were recorded on July 17, 1961.

Personnel
Johnny Griffin — tenor saxophone
Nat Adderley – cornet (except tracks 1, 7 and 9)
Ernie Royal – trumpet (exc. 1, 7, 9)
Clark Terry – flugelhorn (1, 7, 9), trumpet (exc. 1, 7, 9)
Ray Alonge – French horn
Jimmy Cleveland, Paul Faulise, Urbie Green – trombone
Jimmy Jones – piano (exc. 2, 5, 8)
Barry Harris – piano (2, 5, 8)
Barry Galbraith – guitar
Ron Carter – bass
Ben Riley – drums
Alfred Brown, Harry Lookofsky, David Schwartz – violin
Charles McCracken (exc. 2, 5, 8), Lucient Schmit (1, 5, 7–9), Maurice Bialkin, Ray Schweitzer and Edgardo Sodero (2, 5, 8), Abe Kessler and Peter Makas (3, 4, 6, 10) – cello
Melba Liston (exc. 4–6, 8), Norman Simmons (4–6, 8) – arranger

References 

1961 albums
Johnny Griffin albums
Riverside Records albums
Billie Holiday tribute albums
Albums arranged by Melba Liston